The Owl is the sixth studio album by American country music band Zac Brown Band. It was released on September 20, 2019, through Wheelhouse Records.

Content
It is described as the band's "most personal album to date". For this album, the band worked with pop and EDM writer and producers such as Poo Bear, Shawn Mendes, Max Martin, Benny Blanco, Ryan Tedder, and Skrillex. One of the tracks features a collaboration with Brandi Carlile.

Critical reception
Kelly Dearmore of the blog Sounds Like Nashville gave a largely negative review, criticizing the lack of country sound relative to the band's preceding albums and comparing many songs negatively to Brown's electronica side project Sir Rosevelt. Stephen Thomas Erlewine of AllMusic also noted parallels to the Sir Rosevelt album. He concluded his review with "The fact that a good chunk of the numbers work does not erase how deeply strange this album is." 

Pip Ellwood-Hughes of Entertainment Focus gave a negative review stating, "Zac Brown Band have shown what they can do in the past and this set of songs doesn't come close. If this were the debut album of a new pop band, it may be received kindlier but this is a misjudged project from a beloved Country band that attempts to push boundaries but will likely just turn their fans off."

Commercial performance
The Owl debuted at number two on the US Billboard 200 with 106,000 album-equivalent units, including 99,000 pure album sales. It is Zac Brown Band's sixth US top 10 album. The album has sold 137,100 copies in the United States as of March 2020.

Track listing

Personnel

Zac Brown Band
Zac Brown – lead vocals, acoustic and electric guitars
Coy Bowles – electric guitar, electric slide guitar, Hammond organ
Clay Cook – background vocals, clavinet, acoustic guitar, electric guitar, electric slide guitar, Fender Rhodes, Hammond organ, Mellotron, pedal steel guitar, piano, tambourine, Wurlitzer
Daniel de los Reyes – percussion
Jimmy De Martini – acoustic guitar, background vocals, banjo, cello, electric guitar, violin
Chris Fryar – drums
John Driskell Hopkins – background vocals, acoustic guitar, electric guitar, banjo
Matt Mangano – acoustic and electric bass guitars, Moog bass, acoustic guitar

Additional musicians

Brandi Carlile – vocals on "Finish What We Started”
Colette Carlson – background vocals
Johan Carlsson – arranger, bass guitar, clapping, drum programming, acoustic guitar, electric guitar, Hammond organ, percussion, piano, solina, synthesizer, tambourine, background vocals
Andrew DeRoberts – acoustic guitar, drum programming, electric guitar, keyboards, synthesizer bass, background vocals, wurlitzer 
Michael Engstrom – upright bass
Phil Hanseroth – acoustic guitar, background vocals
Tim Hanseroth – acoustic guitar, background vocals
Luke Laird – drum programming
Tove Lo – background vocals

Max Martin – background vocals
Shawn Mendes – background vocals
Doris Sanberg – background vocals 
Don Satchmo – Roland TR-808
Sasha Sirota – background vocals, drum programming
Skrillex – electric guitar, keyboards, drum programming
Peter Svensson – nylon string guitar
Ryan Tedder – background vocals 
Andrew Watt – drum programming 

Production

Brandon Bell – engineer, mixing
Cory Bice – engineer 
Michael H. Brauer – mixing
Johan Carlsson – producer
Alex Chapman – photography 
Clay Cook – engineer, producer 
Dan Davis – Assistant engineer, engineer 
Andrew DeRoberts – engineer, producer
DJ Riggins – mixing assistant 
Serban Ghenea – mixing
Chad Gibson – art direction 
John Hanes – mixing assistant 
Sam Holland – engineer
John Driskell Hopkins – engineer
Jaycen Joshua – mixing
Shivani Kapoor – art direction, design
Peter Karlsson – vocal producer 
Dave Kutch – mastering
Paul Lamalfa – engineer 
Nicole Larson – vocal coach

Jeremy Lertola — engineer 
Victor Lopes – photography 
Matt Mangano – engineer, producer, production coordination
Max Martin – producer 
Michael Mechling – mixing assistant
Happy Perez – producer 
Diego Pernia – art direction, photography 
Poo Bear – producer 
Fernando Reyes – mixing assistant 
Jacob Richards – mixing assistant
Andy Sapp – photography 
Mike Seaburg – mixing assistant 
F. Reid Shippen — mixing 
Sasha Sirota – engineer, producer
Skrillex – engineer, producer
Ryan Tedder – producer  
Matt Tinsley – art direction 
Andrew Watt – producer 
Preston Tate White – assistant engineer 
Evan Wilber – assistant engineer

Charts

Weekly charts

Year-end charts

References

2019 albums
BBR Music Group albums
Zac Brown Band albums
Albums produced by Poo Bear